Masohi is a coastal town on the Indonesian island of Seram.  It is the capital of the Central Maluku Regency (Kebupaten Maluku Tengah). It was the site of a detention camp for political prisoners in the 1970s. It had 36,433 inhabitants at the 2020 Census. The headquarters of Manusela National Park is located in Masohi.

Administrative villages (kelurahan)
The town comprises the five urban villages or kelurahan (with their 2020 Census populations) of Ampera (6,385), Lesane (4,493), Letwaru (6,412), Namaelo (15,280) and Namasina (3,863).

Christian-Muslim violence

The Maluku sectarian conflict impacted Masohi at the end of 1999 and in early 2000.  A fresh outbreak of violence  occurred in 2008 in Masohi over alleged blasphemy by a teacher. Dozens of houses were burnt, as well as a church and a village hall.  Five injuries were reported.

Transportation
 Roads run east and west along the coast from Masohi.  Another road goes over the mountains to Wahai on the north coast.
 An airport exists here, linking Masohi with Ambon and Banda.
 The sea port serves boats arriving from Ambon, Saparua and other parts of the Moluccas.

Around Masohi
Points of interest include the cave Goa Akohi (near Tamilouw village) and a small lake, Ihu Allah.

External links
 Ceram: the Mother Island of Central Maluku

References

Central Maluku Regency
Populated places in Seram Island
Regency seats of Maluku (province)